Aliss Al Islam (born 12 December 1996) is a Bangladeshi cricketer. He made his Twenty20 debut for the Dhaka Dynamites in the 2018–19 Bangladesh Premier League on 11 January 2019. On his T20 debut, he took a hat-trick against the Rangpur Riders, finishing with four wickets for 26 runs, and was named the player of the match. However, two days after the match, he was reported for a suspect bowling action. In November 2019, he was selected to play for the Khulna Tigers in the 2019–20 Bangladesh Premier League.

He made his List A debut on 15 March 2020, for Old DOHS Sports Club, in the 2019–20 Dhaka Premier Division Cricket League.

References

External links
 

1996 births
Living people
Bangladeshi cricketers
Dhaka Dominators cricketers
Old DOHS Sports Club cricketers
Place of birth missing (living people)